Iniistius trivittatus, the three banded razorfish or blue razor wrasse, is a species of marine ray-finned fish from the family Labridae, the wrasses, currently only known from the Pacific waters off Hong Kong and Taiwan. It can reach  in total length.

It is deep bodied and extremely laterally compressed as in all members of its genus. It is distinctively coloured, generally pale yellow with three broad, dark, vertical bars on its body. A further diagnostic trait is the presence of a deep notch between the first two spines of the dorsal fin.

References

trivittatus
Fish described in 2000
Fish of the Pacific Ocean
Fauna of Hong Kong
Fish of Taiwan
Fish of Vietnam